"Lost Highway" is a song by American rock band Bon Jovi. Written by Jon Bon Jovi, Richie Sambora and John Shanks, it is the first track on the album of the same name and was released in September 2007 as the album's second single. The song peaked at number 15 on the Billboard Adult Top 40 chart.

Song information
When the band was writing the song, they took the title both from Hank Williams song and Nashville record company Lost Highway. As soon as they have arrived in Nashville they came up with the idea of the song, written it and recorded it in 48 hours. It could not make the UK Top 75 Singles Chart. In the US, it peaked at No. 15 on the Adult Top 40 chart. A slightly different version of the title track "Lost Highway" was used in the movie Wild Hogs alongside another Bon Jovi song "Wanted Dead or Alive".

The song "Hallelujah" was the b-side track to the single and actually charted in its own right in the UK at #177 from sales of music downloads.

Music video
The video was directed by Anthony Bongiovi and Dave Robertson, featuring band members playing in a country bar and a young woman driving a Saturn Sky on the country road. Suddenly on the radio, she hears the announcement "Here is new one from Bon Jovi. It's 'Lost Highway'." There are also girl and a man on a chopper and family in the station wagon driving on the same road. After a while they all run into a traffic jam because of the road works. Soon they all become very frustrated, the woman in the Saturn Sky takes a map and finds a country road. She decides to turn around, hits the gas and heads toward the bar. Quickly the other drivers follow her, they all arrive in front of a country bar where Bon Jovi are playing. By the time they enter the bar, the band members had already left.

The exterior shots of the bar used in video are shots of the Iron Bull Sallon on Route 120 in Lakemoor and the interior of the bar was shot in Berwyn.

Live performances
The song has been performed at many promotional events for the band including live on the Today show, a performance for MTV Unplugged and at the Live Earth concert held in New Jersey.

The song opened the majority of concerts on the Lost Highway Tour, and has appeared regularly in setlists of The Circle Tour.

Bon Jovi also played the song at the Royal Variety Performance on December 3, 2007.

Releases

Charts

References

2007 songs
2007 singles
Bon Jovi songs
Songs written by John Shanks
Songs written by Richie Sambora
Songs written by Jon Bon Jovi
Island Records singles
Mercury Nashville singles
Country rock songs